Gymnastics World Championships refers to a number of different world championships for each of the disciplines in competitive gymnastics. The International Gymnastics Federation (FIG) organizes World Championships for six disciplines: acrobatic gymnastics, aerobic gymnastics, artistic gymnastics, parkour, rhythmic gymnastics, as well as trampoline and tumbling. The International Federation of Aesthetic Group Gymnastics (IFAGG) organizes World Championships for the sport of aesthetic group gymnastics.

List of championships

FIG

Artistic Gymnastics World Championships

Rhythmic Gymnastics World Championships

Trampoline and Tumbling Gymnastics World Championships

Acrobatic Gymnastics World Championships

Aerobic Gymnastics World Championships

Parkour World Championships

IFAGG

World Aesthetic Group Gymnastics Championships

All-time medal table (FIG disciplines)

Notes
 (1) At the 1993 World Artistic Gymnastics Championships, Valery Belenky earned a bronze medal competing as an unattached (UNA) athlete. Later, official documents from the International Gymnastics Federation credit his medal as a medal for Germany.

See also
 Gymnastics at the Summer Olympics
 Gymnastics at the Youth Olympic Games
 Gymnastics at the World Games
 Junior World Gymnastics Championships
 Major achievements in gymnastics by nation

References

External links
 Sports Acrobatics

 
Gymnastics competitions
Recurring sporting events established in 1903